Denisse is a feminine given name. Notable people with the name include:

Denisse Dibós (born 1967), Peruvian actress
Denisse Fajardo (born 1964), Peruvian volleyball player
Denisse Fuenmayor (born 1979), Venezuelan softball player
Denisse Guerrero (born 1980), Mexican musician and singer-songwriter
Denisse López (born 1976), Mexican gymnast
Denisse Oller, American television journalist
Denisse van Lamoen (born 1979), Chilean archer

See also
Denise (given name)

Feminine given names